Miño is the surname of:

 Fidel Miño (born 1957), Paraguayan footballer
 Galo Miño (1953–1986), Ecuadorian sports shooter
 Gustavo Miño (born 1984), Paraguayan racing cyclist
 Juan Pablo Miño (born 1987), Argentine–born Chilean footballer
 Juan Sánchez Miño (born 1990), Argentine footballer
 Luis Miño (born 1989), Paraguayan footballer
 Marcelo Miño (born 1997), Argentine footballer
 Mariano Miño (born 1994), Argentine footballer
 Rosa Miño (born 1999), Paraguayan footballer
 Rubén Miño (born 1989), Spanish footballer

See also
 Dolores de Miño (1903–1976), Paraguayan politician

Spanish-language surnames